Oscar Hernández Falcón (Havana, 15 March 1891 – 3 March 1967) was a Cuban guitarist and composer. His best-known compositions include the bolero "La Rosa Roja".

References

Cuban songwriters
Male songwriters
1891 births
1967 deaths
Cuban guitarists
20th-century guitarists
20th-century male musicians
Cuban male guitarists